Abdulrahman Al-Dawsari (Arabic:عبد الرحمن الدوسري, born 25 September 1997) is a Saudi Arabian footballer who currently plays for Al-Faisaly and the Saudi Arabia national team.

Career statistics

Club

International
Statistics accurate as of match played 19 November 2019.

External links

References

1997 births
Living people
Saudi Arabian footballers
Al Nassr FC players
Al-Taawoun FC players
Al-Faisaly FC players
Association football midfielders
Saudi Professional League players
Saudi First Division League players
Footballers at the 2018 Asian Games
Saudi Arabia youth international footballers
Saudi Arabia international footballers
Asian Games competitors for Saudi Arabia
20th-century Saudi Arabian people
21st-century Saudi Arabian people